Positive Vibration may refer to:

 Positive Vibration (festival), reggae festival in Liverpool, England
 Positive Vibration (album), 2001 release by Gramps Morgan
 "Positive Vibration" (song), written by Vincent Ford, on the 1976 album Rastaman Vibration by Bob Marley and the Wailers

See also
 Positive Vibrations, 1974 blues album by Ten Years After